The Monthly Film Bulletin was a periodical of the British Film Institute published monthly from February 1934 to April 1991, when it merged with Sight & Sound. It reviewed all films on release in the United Kingdom, including those with a narrow arthouse release.

History
The Monthly Film Bulletin was edited in the mid-1950s by David Robinson, in the late 1950s and early 1960s by Peter John Dyer, and then by Tom Milne.  By the end of the 1960s, when the character and tone of its reviews changed considerably with the arrival of a new generation of critics influenced by the student culture and intellectual tumult of the time (not least the overthrow of old ideas of "taste" and quality), David Wilson was the editor.  It was then edited by Jan Dawson (1938 – 1980), for two years from 1971, and from 1973 until its demise by the New Zealand-born critic Richard Combs.

In 1991, The Monthly Film Bulletin was merged with Sight & Sound, which had until then been published quarterly - Sight & Sound then became a monthly publication and took up The Monthly Film Bulletin'''s remit to review all films released in the UK.The Monthly Film Bulletin was originally published to allow UK cinema managers to decide what films to show, hence the complete cast and production lists, full plot followed by a thorough critique.  Only films that had been registered with the UK government trade authority were covered each month.  During the years of full supporting programmes, The Monthly Film Bulletin printed long lists of B-features and short films with brief capsule reviews; by the 1970s, the tone and style of its reviews had changed considerably, and was increasingly influenced in some cases by the auteur theory and Marxist-influenced film theory, though some more traditional critics such as John Gillett remained, and others such as David McGillivray and Paul Taylor took exploitation movies more seriously than had previously been considered acceptable, while Steve Jenkins wrote a lengthy defence in 1981 of Glen or Glenda.  Another change was that all reviews had a byline - up to September 1968, only the reviews of films considered more significant by the BFI had a partial byline of initials only (so Tom Milne would be "T.M.").  From January 1971, all films were listed in alphabetical order, mainly because a new wave of critics who were influencing the magazine had already overturned the assumptions implicit in the separation of films (for example, several by Sergio Leone and many from the stable of Roger Corman were only included in the "shorter notices" section).  From the July 1982 issue, The Monthly Film Bulletin changed again to include more feature articles, interviews, and photographs.

ContributorsThe Monthly Film Bulletin''s many contributors included:

References

1934 establishments in the United Kingdom
1991 disestablishments in the United Kingdom
Film magazines published in the United Kingdom
Monthly magazines published in the United Kingdom
Defunct magazines published in the United Kingdom
Magazines established in 1934
Magazines disestablished in 1991